State Route 213 (SR 213) is an  route that serves as a connection between Saraland and Prichard in Mobile County.

Route description

The southern terminus of SR 213 is at its intersection with US 45 at Eight Mile in Prichard. From this point it travels in a northeasterly route where it shares a brief concurrency with SR 158 at its junction with I-65. After I-65, the route continues to its northern terminus at US 43 at Saraland.

Major intersections

References

External links

State Route 213 Ends

213
Transportation in Mobile County, Alabama